The Azimut Hotel Murmansk is a high-rise hotel in the center of Murmansk, Russia. It opened in 1984, as the Hotel Arctic and was renamed the Azimut Hotel Murmansk in 2014, following major renovations. It is the tallest building in Murmansk and the tallest building located north of the Arctic Circle.

Description
The hotel is located at 82 Lenin Avenue at Five Corners, Murmansk's main square. Prior to its 2009 closing, the hotel had a restaurant (also called "Arctic"), a cafe (the "Day and Night"), a billiards room, a hairdressing salon, a tanning salon, and several shops, bars, and coffee shops.

History
The first Murmansk hotel named "Arctic" opened in 1933. It was a four–story brick building with 100 rooms.  In 1972 – 1984 the old hotel was demolished and replaced by the current building.

Before 1988 the hotel was a state enterprise. In 1990 it became the property of a joint Soviet–Swedish company. In 1996 it acquired the status of  a municipal hotel and restaurant complex, in 2003 it became a municipal unitary enterprise, and in 2006 it was privatized. Half the shares are held by the City of Murmansk and half by the Azimut Hotels Corporation.

In 1996 (the 80th anniversary of the establishment of Murmansk), following an initiative by mayor Oleg Naydenov, chimes were installed in the hotel which play "My Beloved Arctic", the unofficial anthem of the Murmansk region. The chimes were silenced from 2007 to 2009 for repairs.

Renovation

In 2009 the Hotel Arctic was closed for renovation, to upgrade the comfort and safety of the hotel.

The renovation was undertaken by the Azimut Hotels Company, the architectural firm of Nikolai Lyzlov, and a British architectural firm.

The renovation was designed so as to update the facade, increase the number of elevators, and provide space for boutiques, cafes, and restaurants. The first six or seven floors were converted to office space, with hotel rooms occupying only the upper ten floors.

The hotel reopened as the Azimut Hotel Murmansk on 13 September 2014.

Notable guests
Various persons of note stayed at the old or new Arctic, including the Soviet physicist Sergei Vavilov, the arctic explorers Vladimir Wiese, Otto Schmidt, and Ivan Papanin, the Soviet writers Veniamin Kaverin, Konstantin Simonov, and Valentin Kataev, and the Russian/Soviet zoologist Nikolai Knipovich. The hotel provides accommodation for participants in the Northern Festival (the "Polar Olympics") which is held in Murmansk.

In literature
The Arctic is mentioned in the poem "A Toast to Zhenya" by Yuri Vizbor:

References

External links
Azimut Hotel Murmansk official website 
Presentation on the renovation project (PDF), see pages 32 – 39. 

Murmansk
Hotels in Russia
Hotels established in 1984
Hotel buildings completed in 1984
Buildings and structures in Murmansk Oblast
Hotels built in the Soviet Union
1984 establishments in the Soviet Union